Petter's gerbil or Petter's tateril (Taterillus petteri) is a species of rodent found in Burkina Faso, Mali, and Niger. Its natural habitats are dry savanna, subtropical or tropical dry shrubland, arable land, and rural gardens.

References

Taterillus
Mammals described in 1985
Rodents of Africa
Taxonomy articles created by Polbot